The Belgium men's national intercrosse team is the intercrosse team representing Belgium internationally, and a member of the  Fédération Internationale d’Inter-Crosse (FIIC). The team also participated at the 1999 Intercrosse World Championship and 2000 Intercrosse World Championship.

Tournament history

External links 
 FIIC official site
 History

See also 
Intercrosse

Intercrosse